Pickburn and Brodsworth railway station was a small railway station situated on the South Yorkshire Junction Railway's line between Wrangbrook Junction and Denaby and Conisbrough.

The station was similar to that at Sprotborough and controlled by a signal box which was replaced in 1910 when the opening of Brodsworth Colliery necessitated a larger installation. A short branch was built to access the colliery from this point.

References 

"Railways of South Yorkshire", C.T. Goode, Dalesman Publications. 

Disused railway stations in Doncaster
Former Hull and Barnsley Railway stations
Railway stations in Great Britain opened in 1894
Railway stations in Great Britain closed in 1903